Sandalore is a synthetic sandalwood odorant with odor in some ways similar to sandalwood and consequently used in perfumes, emollients, and skin cleaning agents. Sandalore, and the similar brahmanol, have been identified as agonists of the cutaneous olfactory receptor OR2AT4, and found to induce strong Ca2+ signals in cultured human keratinocytes. The long-term stimulation of keratinocytes with Sandalore positively affected cell proliferation and migration, and regeneration of keratinocyte monolayers in an in vitro wound scratch assay (i.e., sandalore stimulation also enhanced epidermal "wound healing" in human skin organ cultures). Natural sandalwood oil and other synthetic sandalwood odorants did not have the same effect.

References

Secondary alcohols
Perfume ingredients